Lavies is a surname. Notable people with this surname include:

 Hubert Lavies (1833–1905), American farmer
 Peter Lavies (1790–1876), American farmer, tavernkeeper, and moneylender

See also
 Davies
 Lavy
 Lavie (disambiguation)